Lippo di Benivieni (active 1296–1327) was a Florentine painter active during the first third of the fourteenth century. Little is known of his biography.

References

14th-century Italian painters
Anonymous artists
Gothic painters
Painters from Florence